Fahir Özgüden (1933 – 8 August 1979) was a Turkish hurdler who competed in the 1960 Summer Olympics.

References

1933 births
1979 deaths
Turkish male hurdlers
Olympic athletes of Turkey
Athletes (track and field) at the 1960 Summer Olympics
Mediterranean Games gold medalists for Turkey
Mediterranean Games medalists in athletics
Athletes (track and field) at the 1959 Mediterranean Games
20th-century Turkish people